Mohammed Bouyeri (born 8 March 1978) is a Moroccan-Dutch convicted terrorist serving a life sentence without parole in the prison of Nieuw Vosseveld (Vught) for the assassination of Dutch film director Theo van Gogh. A member of the Hofstad Network, he was incarcerated in 2004 and has since been serving a sentence of life with no possibility of parole.

Early life
Mohammed Bouyeri is a second-generation Moroccan-Dutchman of Berber origin. In 1995, Mohammed Bouyeri finished his secondary education. At university, he changed his major several times and left after five years without obtaining a degree. Bouyeri used the pen name "Abu Zubair" for writing and translating. He often posted letters online and sent e-mails under this name.

At an early age he was known to the police as a member of a group of Moroccan "problem-youth". For a while he worked as a volunteer at Eigenwijks, a neighbourhood organization in Amsterdam's Slotervaart suburb. After his mother died and his father remarried in the fall of 2003, he started to live according to strict interpretations of Sunni Islamic Sharia law. As a result, he could perform fewer and fewer tasks at Eigenwijks. For example, he refused to serve alcohol and did not want to be present at activities attended by both women and men. Finally, he put an end to his activities at Eigenwijks altogether. He grew a beard and began to wear a djellaba. He frequently visited the El Tawheed mosque where he met other radical Sunnis, among whom was the suspected terrorist Samir Azzouz. With the group of radicals he is said to have formed the Hofstad Network, a Dutch terrorist cell.

Assassination of Theo van Gogh

Background
Filmmaker Theo van Gogh was a vigorous and often polemic critic of several aspects and figures of Dutch society, including religion. In 2004, van Gogh and Ayaan Hirsi Ali, a Somali refugee who had become a member of the House of Representatives of the Netherlands, directed a short film called Submission, Part I about Islam and violence against women. In the film, women are shown wearing transparent clothes with verses of the Quran written on their bodies. The film first aired in August 2004 on Dutch television in prime time.

Assassination
The 26-year-old Bouyeri assassinated van Gogh in the early morning of 2 November 2004 in front of the Amsterdam-Oost borough office (Dutch: stadsdeelkantoor) while he was bicycling to work. Bouyeri shot van Gogh eight times with a handgun and also wounded two bystanders. Wounded, van Gogh ran to the other side of the road and fell to the ground on the cycle lane. Bouyeri then walked up to van Gogh, who was still lying down, and shot him several more times at close range. Bouyeri then cut van Gogh's throat and tried to decapitate him with a large knife, after which he stabbed the knife deep into van Gogh's chest, reaching his spinal cord. He then attached a five-page note to the body with a smaller knife before fleeing. Van Gogh died on the spot.

The written note contained a warning to Ayaan Hirsi Ali. It also made mention of the Jewish political actors in Ali's party, as well as other parties in Dutch politics. It contained repeated references to Jewish party-backers and party leaders. The letter refers to the fundamentalist ideology of the Takfir wal-Hijra. It was signed Saifu Deen alMuwahhied.

Arrest
Following an exchange of gunfire with police, during which he was shot in the leg, police arrested Bouyeri close to the scene of the crime shortly after its commission. In his interrogations, he exercised his right to remain silent. On 11 November, public prosecutor Leo de Wit charged him with six criminal acts: murder, attempted murder (of a police officer), attempted manslaughter (of by-standers and police officers), violation of the law on gun control, suspicion of participation in a criminal organization with terrorist aims, and conspiracy to murder with a terrorist purpose against van Gogh, Representative Ayaan Hirsi Ali, and others.

When arrested, Bouyeri had on him a farewell poem titled In bloed gedoopt ("Baptized in Blood").

Trial

Bouyeri's trial took place over two days, 11 and 12 July 2005, in a high-security building in Amsterdam's Osdorp neighbourhood. In a letter on 8 July, Bouyeri announced that he would not attend the trial voluntarily and that he did not accept its jurisdiction. The prosecutor demanded that he be forcibly transported to the courthouse, which the court granted. Bouyeri's lawyers attended the trial, but they did not ask questions or make closing statements. Bouyeri appeared before the court carrying a Quran under his arm.

At the trial, Bouyeri expressed no remorse for the murder he admitted to having committed, telling the victim's mother, "I do not feel your pain. I do not have any sympathy for you. I cannot feel for you because I think you are a non-believer." Bouyeri also expressed that he would have done it again if he had the chance. Bouyeri also argued that "in the fight of the believers against the infidels, violence is approved by the prophet Muhammad".

The prosecutor demanded life imprisonment for Bouyeri, stating, "The defendant rejects our democracy. He even wants to bring down our democracy. With violence. He is insistent. To this day. He sticks to his views with perseverance." On 26 July 2005, Bouyeri was sentenced to life in prison, which is the most severe punishment under Dutch law. Unlike other countries in Europe, life imprisonment carries no chance of parole in the Netherlands. A release is technically possible via a pardon by the reigning monarch, but this is extremely rare; only a few of these pardons have ever been successful in recent history. Other than war criminals, Bouyeri is only the 28th person to receive this punishment since 1945, and the only person to receive a life sentence for a single murder without aggravating circumstances. Life sentences were seen only with multiple-homicide cases, but the Wet terroristische misdrijven (Terrorist Crimes Law) that went into effect on 10 August 2004 extended it to leaders of terrorist organisations. Imprisonments ordinarily in excess of 15 years can be upgraded to life imprisonment, as was the case with Bouyeri.

Bouyeri is held in the EBI (Supermax) facility within Nieuw Vosseveld prison. There he met Ridouan Taghi with whome he developed a close bond. Because of this relationship, Bouyeri was moved to another prison. Taghi and Bouyeri continued writing each other in Arabic, mostly consisting of Quran verses.

In popular culture
  South African artist Marlene Dumas drew a portrait of Bouyeri in 2005 that has been displayed in the Stedelijk Museum.
 Leon de Winter's bestselling 2012 novel Acts of Kindness features Bouyeri and van Gogh as characters.
 Journalist Theodor Holman, one of van Gogh's best friends, wrote a film in 2014 called 2/11 – Het Spel van de Wolf (a reference to the date van Gogh was killed, November 2; "The Game of the Wolf") that "posits a far-fetched theory that the CIA was in a way responsible for the murder by pressuring the Dutch secret service not to arrest Mr. Bouyeri—whom Dutch authorities had been monitoring—to use him to get to a bigger fish with ties to Al Qaeda". The film premiered at the Netherlands Film Festival in October 2014 and played on national television on November 2, 2014. The title alludes to Van Gogh's movie 06/05, in which it's implied that Pim Fortuyn's murder was facilitated by the Dutch secret service agency.

See also

 Islam in Europe
 Islam in the Netherlands
 Jyllands-Posten Muhammad cartoons controversy
 Kurt Westergaard
 Berbers in the Netherlands

References

Further reading
2 November - Death of a filmmaker
"Text of the farewell poem" at  Indymedia
Albert Benschop. Chronicle of a Political Murder Foretold: Jihad in the Netherlands
Report of Ruud Peters, an expert witness for the prosecution, "Peters Report" (in Dutch)

Further reading
Ian Buruma, Murder in Amsterdam: the Death of Theo van Gogh and the Limits of Tolerance (New York: Penguin Press, 2006). 

 

20th-century Dutch criminals
21st-century Moroccan criminals
1978 births
Living people
Dutch assassins
Dutch Islamists
Dutch people of Moroccan-Berber descent
Criminals from Amsterdam
Islamic terrorism in the Netherlands
Hofstad Network
Dutch prisoners sentenced to life imprisonment
Prisoners sentenced to life imprisonment by the Netherlands
Moroccan prisoners sentenced to life imprisonment
Moroccan people imprisoned abroad
People convicted of murder by the Netherlands
Dutch people convicted of murder
Muslims with branch missing
Islamist assassins